Akdamar is a village in the Samsat District of Adıyaman Province in Turkey. Its population is 76 (2021).

References

Villages in Samsat District